Gyula Hajdu is a Hungarian sprint canoer who competed in the early 1980s. He won a gold medal in the C-2 1000 m event at the 1982 ICF Canoe Sprint World Championships in Belgrade and a silver medal in the C-1 500 m event at the 1978 ICF Canoe Sprint World Championships in Belgrade.

References

Hungarian male canoeists
Living people
Year of birth missing (living people)
ICF Canoe Sprint World Championships medalists in Canadian
20th-century Hungarian people